Dyschiriomimus stackelbergi is a species of beetle in the family Carabidae, the only species in the genus Dyschiriomimus.

References

Scaritinae